Feng shui, sometimes called Chinese geomancy, is an ancient Chinese traditional practice which claims to use energy forces to harmonize individuals with their surrounding environment. The term feng shui means, literally, "wind-water" (i.e. fluid). From ancient times, landscapes and bodies of water were thought to direct the flow of the universal Qi – "cosmic current" or energy – through places and structures. More broadly, feng shui includes astronomical, astrological, architectural, cosmological, geographical and topographical dimensions.

Historically, as well as in many parts of the contemporary Chinese world, feng shui was used to orient buildings and spiritually significant structures such as tombs, as well as dwellings and other structures. One scholar writes that in contemporary Western societies, however, "feng shui tends to be reduced to interior design for health and wealth. It has become increasingly visible through 'feng shui consultants' and corporate architects who charge large sums of money for their analysis, advice and design."

Feng shui has been identified as both non-scientific and pseudoscientific by scientists and philosophers and has been described as a paradigmatic example of pseudoscience. It exhibits a number of classic pseudoscientific aspects, such as making claims about the functioning of the world which are not amenable to testing with the scientific method.

History

Origins
The Yangshao and Hongshan cultures provide the earliest known evidence for the use of feng shui. Until the invention of the magnetic compass, feng shui relied on astronomy to find correlations between humans and the universe.
In 4000 BC, the doors of dwellings in Banpo were aligned with the asterism Yingshi just after the winter solstice—this sited the homes for solar gain. During the Zhou era, Yingshi was known as Ding and it was used to indicate the appropriate time to build a capital city, according to the Shijing. The late Yangshao site at Dadiwan (c. 3500–3000 BC) includes a palace-like building (F901) at its center. The building faces south and borders a large plaza. It stands on a north–south axis with another building that apparently housed communal activities. Regional communities may have used the complex. 

A grave at Puyang (around 4000 BC) that contains mosaics— a Chinese star map of the Dragon and Tiger asterisms and Beidou (the Big Dipper, Ladle or Bushel)— is oriented along a north–south axis. The presence of both round and square shapes in the Puyang tomb, at Hongshan ceremonial centers and at the late Longshan settlement at Lutaigang,
suggests that gaitian cosmography (heaven-round, earth-square) existed in Chinese society long before it appeared in the Zhoubi Suanjing.

Cosmography that bears a resemblance to modern feng shui devices and formulas appears on a piece of jade unearthed at Hanshan and dated around 3000 BC. Archaeologist Li Xueqin links the design to the liuren astrolabe, zhinan zhen and luopan.

Beginning with palatial structures at Erlitou, all capital cities of China followed rules of feng shui for their design and layout. During the Zhou era, the Kaogong ji ("Manual of Crafts") codified these rules. The carpenter's manual Lu ban jing ("Lu ban's manuscript") codified rules for builders. Graves and tombs also followed rules of feng shui from Puyang to Mawangdui and beyond. From the earliest records, the structures of the graves and dwellings seem to have followed the same rules.

Early instruments and techniques

Some of the foundations of feng shui go back more than 3,500 years before the invention of the magnetic compass. It originated in Chinese astronomy. Some current techniques can be traced to Neolithic China, while others were added later (most notably the Han dynasty, the Tang, the Song, and the Ming).

The astronomical history of feng shui is evident in the development of instruments and techniques. According to the Zhouli, the original feng shui instrument may have been a gnomon. Chinese used circumpolar stars to determine the north–south axis of settlements. This technique explains why Shang palaces at Xiaotun lie 10° east of due north. In some of the cases, as Paul Wheatley observed, they bisected the angle between the directions of the rising and setting sun to find north. This technique provided the more precise alignments of the Shang walls at Yanshi and Zhengzhou. Rituals for using a feng shui instrument required a diviner to examine current sky phenomena to set the device and adjust their position in relation to the device.

The oldest examples of instruments used for feng shui are liuren astrolabes, also known as shi. These consist of a lacquered, two-sided board with astronomical sightlines. The earliest examples of liuren astrolabes have been unearthed from tombs that date between 278 BC and 209 BC. Along with divination for Da Liu Ren the boards were commonly used to chart the motion of Taiyi through the nine palaces.  The markings on a liuren/shi and the first magnetic compasses are virtually identical.

The magnetic compass was invented for feng shui and has been in use since its invention.  Traditional feng shui instrumentation consists of the Luopan or the earlier south-pointing spoon ( zhinan zhen)—though a conventional compass could suffice if one understood the differences. A feng shui ruler (a later invention) may also be employed.

Foundational concepts

Definition and classification 
The goal of feng shui as practiced today is to situate the human-built environment on spots with good qi, an imagined form of "energy". The "perfect spot" is a location and an axis in time.

Traditional feng shui is inherently a form of ancestor worship. Popular in farming communities for centuries, it was built on the idea that the ghosts of ancestors and other independent, intangible forces, both personal and impersonal, affected the material world, and that these forces needed to be placated through rites and suitable burial places, which the feng shui practitioner would assist with for a fee.  The  primary underlying value was material success for the living.

According to Stuart Vyse, feng shui is "a very popular superstition." The PRC government has also labeled it as superstitious. Feng shui is classified as a pseudoscience since it exhibits a number of classic pseudoscientific aspects such as making claims about the functioning of the world which are not amenable to testing with the scientific method. It has been identified as both non-scientific and pseudoscientific by scientists and philosophers, and has been described as a paradigmatic example of pseudoscience.

Qi (ch'i)

Qi (pronounced "chee", "cee", or "tsee") is a movable positive or negative life force which plays an essential role in feng shui. The Book of Burial says that burial takes advantage of "vital qi".  The goal of feng shui is to take advantage of vital qi by appropriate siting of graves and structures.

Polarity
Polarity is expressed in feng shui as yin and yang theory. That is, it is of two parts: one creating an exertion and one receiving the exertion. The development of this theory and its corollary, five phase theory (five element theory), have also been linked with astronomical observations of sunspot.

The Five Elements or Forces (wu xing) – which, according to the Chinese, are metal, earth, fire, water, and wood – are first mentioned in Chinese literature in a chapter of the classic Book of History. They play a very important part in Chinese thought: ‘elements’ meaning generally not so much the actual substances as the forces essential to human life.  Earth is a buffer, or an equilibrium achieved when the polarities cancel each other. While the goal of Chinese medicine is to balance yin and yang in the body, the goal of feng shui has been described as aligning a city, site, building, or object with yin-yang force fields.

Bagua (eight trigrams)
Eight diagrams known as bagua (or pa kua) loom large in feng shui, and both predate their mentions in the Yijing (or I Ching).  The Lo (River) Chart (Luoshu) was developed first, and is sometimes associated with Later Heaven arrangement of the bagua. This and the Yellow River Chart (Hetu, sometimes associated with the Earlier Heaven bagua) are linked to astronomical events of the sixth millennium BC, and with the Turtle Calendar from the time of Yao. The Turtle Calendar of Yao (found in the Yaodian section of the Shangshu or Book of Documents) dates to 2300 BC, plus or minus 250 years.

In Yaodian, the cardinal directions are determined by the marker-stars of the mega-constellations known as the Four Celestial Animals:
East: The Azure Dragon (Spring equinox)—Niao (Bird ), α Scorpionis
South: The Vermilion Bird (Summer solstice)—Huo (Fire ), α Hydrae
West: The White Tiger (Autumn equinox)—Mǎo (Hair ), η Tauri (the Pleiades)
North: The Black Tortoise (Winter solstice)—Xū (Emptiness, Void ), α Aquarii, β Aquarii

The diagrams are also linked with the sifang (four directions) method of divination used during
the Shang dynasty. The sifang is much older, however. It was used at Niuheliang, and figured large in Hongshan culture's astronomy. And it is this area of China that is linked to Yellow Emperor (Huangdi) who allegedly invented the south-pointing spoon (see compass).

Traditional feng shui
Traditional feng shui is an ancient system based upon the observation of heavenly time and earthly space. Literature, as well as archaeological evidence, provide some idea of the origins and nature of feng shui techniques. Aside from books, there is also a strong oral history. In many cases, masters have passed on their techniques only to selected students or relatives. Modern practitioners of feng shui draw from several branches in their own practices.

Form Branch
The Form Branch is the oldest branch of feng shui. Qing Wuzi in the Han dynasty describes it in the Book of the Tomb and Guo Pu of the Jin dynasty follows up with a more complete description in The Book of Burial.

The Form branch was originally concerned with the location and orientation of tombs (Yin House feng shui), which was of great importance. The branch then progressed to the consideration of homes and other buildings (Yang House feng shui).

The "form" in Form branch refers to the shape of the environment, such as mountains, rivers, plateaus, buildings, and general surroundings. It considers the five celestial animals (vermillion phoenix, azure dragon, white tiger, black turtle, and the yellow snake), the yin-yang concept and the traditional five elements (Wu Xing: wood, fire, earth, metal, and water).

The Form branch analyzes the shape of the land and flow of the wind and water to find a place with ideal qi. It also considers the time of important events such as the birth of the resident and the building of the structure.

Compass Branch
The Compass branch is a collection of more recent feng shui techniques based on the Eight Directions, each of which is said to have unique qi. It uses the Luopan, a disc marked with formulas in concentric rings around a magnetic compass.

The Compass Branch includes techniques such as Flying Star and Eight Mansions.

Western forms of feng shui
More recent forms of feng shui simplify principles that come from the traditional branches, and focus mainly on the use of the bagua.

Aspirations Method
The Eight Life Aspirations style of feng shui is a simple system which coordinates each of the eight cardinal directions with a specific life aspiration or station such as family, wealth, fame, etc., which come from the Bagua government of the eight aspirations. Life Aspirations is not otherwise a geomantic system.

List of specific feng shui branches

Ti Li (Form Branch)

Popular Xingshi Pai "forms" methods 
 Luan Tou Pai, Pinyin: luán tóu pài, (environmental analysis without using a compass)
 Xingfa Pai, Pinyin: xíng fǎ pài

Liiqi Pai (Compass Branch)

Popular Liiqi Pai "Compass" methods 
San Yuan Method,  (Pinyin: sān yuán pài)
 Dragon Gate Eight Formation,  (Pinyin: lóng mén bā fǎ)
 Xuan Kong,  (time and space methods)
 Xuan Kong Fei Xing  (Flying Stars methods of time and directions)
 Xuan Kong Da Gua,  ("Secret Decree" or 64 gua relationships)
 Xuan Kong Mi Zi,  (Mysterious Space Secret Decree)
 Xuan Kong Liu Fa,  (Mysterious Space Six Techniques)
 Zi Bai Jue,  (Purple White Scroll)
San He Method,  (environmental analysis using a compass)
 Accessing Dragon Methods
 Ba Zhai,  (Eight Mansions)
 Yang Gong Feng Shui, 
 Water Methods, 
 Local Embrace

Others
 Yin House Feng Shui,  (Feng Shui for the deceased)
 Four Pillars of Destiny,  (a form of hemerology)
 Zi Wei Dou Shu,  (Purple Star Astrology)
 I-Ching,  (Book of Changes)
 Qi Men Dun Jia,  (Mysterious Door Escaping Techniques)
 Da Liu Ren,  (Divination: Big Six Heavenly Yang Water Qi)
 Tai Yi Shen Shu,  (Divination: Tai Yi Magical Calculation Method)
 Date Selection,  (Selection of auspicious dates and times for important events)
 Chinese Palmistry,  (Destiny reading by palm reading)
 Chinese Face Reading,  (Destiny reading by face reading)
 Major & Minor Wandering Stars (Constellations)
 Five phases,  (relationship of the five phases or wuxing)
 BTB Black (Hat) Tantric Buddhist Sect (Westernised or Modern methods not based on Classical teachings)
 Symbolic Feng Shui, (New Age Feng Shui methods that advocate substitution with symbolic (spiritual, appropriate representation of five elements) objects if natural environment or object/s is/are not available or viable)
 Pierce Method of Feng Shui ( Sometimes Pronounced : Von Shway ) The practice of melding striking with soothing furniture arrangements to promote peace and prosperity

Contemporary uses of traditional feng shui

After Richard Nixon's visit to the People's Republic of China in 1972, feng shui practices became popular in the United States. Critics warn that claims of scientific validity have proven to be false and that the practices are pseudoscientific. Others charge that it has been reinvented and commercialized by New Age entrepreneurs, or are concerned that much of the traditional theory has been lost in translation, not given proper consideration, frowned upon, or scorned. 

Feng shui has nonetheless found many uses. Landscape ecologists often find traditional feng shui an interesting study. In many cases, the only remaining patches of Asian old forest  are "feng shui woods," associated with cultural heritage, historical continuity, and the preservation of various flora and fauna species. Some researchers interpret the presence of these woods as indicators that the "healthy homes," sustainability  and environmental components of traditional feng shui should not be easily dismissed. Environmental scientists and landscape architects have researched traditional feng shui and its methodologies. Architects study feng shui as an Asian architectural tradition. Geographers have analyzed the techniques and methods to help locate historical sites in Victoria, British Columbia, Canada, and archaeological sites in the American Southwest, concluding that Native Americans also considered astronomy and landscape features.

Believers use it for healing purposes, to guide their businesses, or to create a peaceful atmosphere in their homes, although there is no empirical evidence that it is effective. In particular, they use feng shui in the bedroom, where a number of techniques involving colors and arrangement are thought to promote comfort and peaceful sleep. Some users of feng shui may be trying to gain a sense of security or control, for example by choosing auspicious numbers for their phones or favorable house locations. Their motivation is similar to the reasons that some people consult fortune-tellers.

In 2005, Hong Kong Disneyland acknowledged feng shui as an important part of Chinese culture by shifting the main gate by twelve degrees in their building plans. This was among actions suggested by the planner of architecture and design at Walt Disney Imagineering, Wing Chao. At Singapore Polytechnic and other institutions, professionals including engineers, architects, property agents and interior designers, take courses on feng shui and divination every year, a number of whom become part-time or full-time feng shui consultants.

Criticisms

Traditional feng shui
Matteo Ricci (1552–1610), one of the founding fathers of Jesuit China missions, may have been the first European to write about feng shui practices. His account in De Christiana expeditione apud Sinas tells about feng shui masters (geologi, in Latin) studying prospective construction sites or grave sites "with reference to the head and the tail and the feet of the particular dragons which are supposed to dwell beneath that spot." As a Catholic missionary, Ricci strongly criticized the "recondite science" of geomancy along with astrology as yet another superstitio absurdissima of the heathens: "What could be more absurd than their imagining that the safety of a family, honors, and their entire existence must depend upon such trifles as a door being opened from one side or another, as rain falling into a courtyard from the right or from the left, a window opened here or there, or one roof being higher than another?"

Victorian-era commentators on feng shui were generally ethnocentric, and as such skeptical and derogatory of what they knew of feng shui. In 1896, at a meeting of the Educational Association of China, Rev. P. W. Pitcher railed at the "rottenness of the whole scheme of Chinese architecture," and urged fellow missionaries "to erect unabashedly Western edifices of several stories and with towering spires in order to destroy nonsense about fung-shuy."

After the founding of the People's Republic of China in 1949, feng shui was officially considered a "feudalistic superstitious practice" and a "social evil" according to the state's ideology and was discouraged and even banned outright at times. Feng shui remained popular in Hong Kong, and also in the Republic of China (Taiwan), where traditional culture was not suppressed.

During the Cultural Revolution (1966-1976) feng shui was classified as one of the so-called Four Olds that were to be wiped out. Feng shui practitioners were beaten and abused by Red Guards and their works burned. After the death of Mao Zedong and the end of the Cultural Revolution, the official attitude became more tolerant but restrictions on feng shui practice are still in place in today's China. It is illegal in the PRC today to register feng shui consultation as a business and similarly advertising feng shui practice is banned. There have been frequent crackdowns on feng shui practitioners on the grounds of "promoting feudalistic superstitions" such as one in Qingdao in early 2006 when the city's business and industrial administration office shut down an art gallery converted into a feng shui practice. Some officials who had consulted feng shui were terminated and expelled from the Communist Party.

In 21st century mainland China less than one-third of the population believe in feng shui, and the proportion of believers among young urban Chinese is said to be even lower. Chinese academics permitted to research feng shui are anthropologists or architects by profession, studying the history of feng shui or historical feng shui theories behind the design of heritage buildings. They include Cai Dafeng, Vice-President of Fudan University.  Learning in order to practice feng shui is still somewhat considered taboo. Nevertheless, it is reported that feng shui has gained adherents among Communist Party officials according to a BBC Chinese news commentary in 2006, and since the beginning of Chinese economic reforms the number of feng shui practitioners is increasing.

Contemporary feng shui
One critic called the situation of feng shui in today's world "ludicrous and confusing," asking "Do we really believe that mirrors and flutes are going to change people's tendencies in any lasting and meaningful way?" He called for much further study or "we will all go down the tubes because of our inability to match our exaggerated claims with lasting changes." Robert T. Carroll sums up the charges:

...feng shui has become an aspect of interior decorating in the Western world and alleged masters of feng shui now hire themselves out for hefty sums to tell people such as Donald Trump which way his doors and other things should hang. Feng shui has also become another New Age "energy" scam with arrays of metaphysical products...offered for sale to help you improve your health, maximize your potential, and guarantee fulfillment of some fortune cookie philosophy.
Skeptics charge that evidence for its effectiveness is based primarily upon anecdote and users are often offered conflicting advice from different practitioners, though feng shui practitioners use these differences as evidence of variations in practice or different branches of thought. A critical analyst concluded that "Feng shui has always been based upon mere guesswork." Another objection was to the compass, a traditional tool for choosing favorable locations for property or burials. Critics point out that the compass degrees are often inaccurate because solar winds disturb the electromagnetic field of the earth. Magnetic North on the compass will be inaccurate because true magnetic north fluctuates.

The American magicians Penn and Teller dedicated an episode of their Bullshit! television show to criticize the acceptance of feng shui in the Western world as science. They devised a test in which the same dwelling was visited by five different feng shui consultants: each produced a different opinion about the dwelling, showing there is no consistency in the professional practice of feng shui.

Feng shui is criticized by Christians around the world. Some have argued that it is "entirely inconsistent with Christianity to believe that harmony and balance result from the manipulation and channeling of nonphysical forces or energies, or that such can be done by means of the proper placement of physical objects. Such techniques, in fact, belong to the world of sorcery."

Feng shui practitioners in China have found officials that are considered superstitious and corrupt easily interested, despite official disapproval. In one instance, in 2009, county officials in Gansu, on the advice of feng shui practitioners, spent $732,000 to haul a 369-ton "spirit rock" to the county seat to ward off "bad luck." Feng shui may require social influence or money because experts, architecture or design changes, and moving from place to place is expensive. Less influential or less wealthy people lose faith in feng shui, saying that it is a game only for the wealthy. Others, however, practice less expensive forms of feng shui, including hanging special (but cheap) mirrors, forks, or woks in doorways to deflect negative energy.

See also

 Bagua
 Book of Burial
 Chinese fortune telling
 Chinese spiritual world concepts
 Four Symbols
 Five elements
 Geomancy
 Green Satchel Classic
 Luopan
 Tung Shing (Chinese almanac)
 Shigandang
 Ley line
 Tajul muluk
 Vastu shastra

References

Sources

Books
 
 
 
 
 
 , various years, vol I-II-III-IV-V-VI
 .
 
 
 
 
 
 
 
 
 . Includes translations of Archetypal burial classic of Qing Wu; The inner chapter of the Book of burial rooted in antiquity ; The yellow emperor's classic of house siting; Twenty four difficult problems; The secretly passed down water dragon classic.
 
 
 , length=616 pages  ## 71
 
 , length=150 pages
 
 
 
 
 
 
 
  Dover reprint ISBN 0-486-28092-6
 
 , length=440, Review= https://physicstoday.scitation.org/doi/full/10.1063/1.1445553

Theses

Articles and chapters

Blogs and online

Web

  practitioner, turned to dowsing.
  not really archived. Moreover the sentence to be proven is rather void

Miscellaneous

Traditional China
 

  
  . The "Ming Sizong robbed Li Zicheng's ancestral grave" section can be read at

Post-1949 China
2001 
2006 
2010 
2013

U.S.A
2005 .

Aesthetics
Architectural theory
Chinese gardening styles
Chinese words and phrases
Divination
Environmental design
Geomancy
New Age practices
Pseudoscience
Superstitions
Taoist cosmology
Taoist divination
Types of garden
Yangshao culture